Lath (foaled 1732) was a British Thoroughbred racehorse. He won at least four races, including a 1000-guinea sweepstakes at Newmarket and a match race against Squirt. After retiring from racing he became a stallion and produced a number of high-class runners and also sired the grand-dam of St. Leger winner Hollandoise.

Background
Lath was a bay colt bred by Francis Godolphin, 2nd Earl of Godolphin, and foaled in 1732. His dam was Roxana, a daughter of Bald Galloway. In 1731 she was intended to be covered by Hobgoblin, but he refused her, so she was sent to the Godolphin Arabian, who at the time was acting as a teaser stallion to Hobgoblin. The mating produced Lath, who was the Godolphin Arabian's first foal. Roxana later foaled Roundhead (by Flying Childers) and Cade (also by Godolphin Arabian). After Lath's success on the racetrack, the Godolphin Arabian went on to become a top stallion and was champion sire in 1738, 1745 and 1747. He sired Cade, Regulus and Blank, who also went on to become champion sires.

Racing career
On 23 April 1737, he won a sweepstakes of 1000 guineas at Newmarket, beating the Earl of Portmore's Squirt and Duke of Devonshire's John Trott along with seven others. Later in the year, he beat Little Partner over four miles for 200 guineas. In October 1738, he beat Squirt, also over four miles, for 300 guineas. He also won a race for £50 at Marlborough. He was described as "one of the best horses that appeared at Newmarket since the time of Childers."

Summary of known races

Stud career
After retiring from racing Lath was sold to John Turner and later William Cavendish, 3rd Duke of Devonshire. The most notable of Lath's progeny were:

 Red Cap (1744) – a chestnut stallion who won a race at Ludlow and one at Newmarket.
 Miss (1754) – a chestnut mare who foaled the dam of Great Subscription Purse winner Chatsworth.
 Ancaster Crazy –  a chestnut mare who foaled Virago, the winner of many races and dam of St.Leger winner Hollandoise.

Pedigree

References

1732 racehorse births
Racehorses bred in the Kingdom of Great Britain
Racehorses trained in the Kingdom of Great Britain
Thoroughbred family 6-a